Heggjabygda is a village in Stad Municipality in Vestland county, Norway. The village is located along the northern shore of the large lake Hornindalsvatnet. Heggjabygda Church is located in the village, right along the lake shore. The village sits at the intersection of Norwegian county roads 664 and 665 with connections to the village of Fyrde (in Volda Municipality) to the north and the villages of Mogrenda and Nordfjordeid to the east.

References

Villages in Vestland
Stad, Norway